Carol Burdan (born 1912, date of death unknown) was a Romanian footballer who played as a goalkeeper.

International career
Carol Burdan played three matches for Romania, making his debut on 14 October 1934 under coach Alexandru Săvulescu in friendly which ended 3–3 against Poland. His following two games were a 2–2 against Greece and a 3–2 victory against Bulgaria at the 1934–35 Balkan Cup.

Honours
Venus București
Divizia A: 1933–34, 1936–37

References

External links
 

1912 births
Year of death missing
Romanian footballers
Romania international footballers
Place of birth missing
Association football forwards
Liga I players
CS Gloria Arad players
Venus București players
Victoria Cluj players